WKWY (102.7 FM) is a radio station broadcasting a country music format, and licensed to Tompkinsville, Kentucky, United States. WKWY is owned by Jonathan Keeton, through licensee Frank Keeton Aircasters, Inc.

References

External links

KWY
Tompkinsville, Kentucky